Annisquam is a waterfront village in the city of Gloucester, on the North Shore of Massachusetts.  It is a few miles across Cape Ann from downtown Gloucester.

History
The name "Annisquam" comes from an Algonquian term meaning "top of the rock, containing <wanashque>, "on top of", and <-ompsk>, "rock". The first European settlement in Annisquam was established in 1631. In the late 19th-century, it was home to both granite quarrying and an artist colony, which attracted painters including George Loftus Noyes and Margaret Fitzhugh Browne.

Annisquam is primarily a residential village. Its only businesses include a restaurant and marina, a small hotel, a real estate company, a library and the Annisquam Yacht Club, founded in 1896. Because of its small size, historic architecture and secluded geography, Annisquam remains a popular summer resort.

At the mouth of the Annisquam River on Ipswich Bay is Annisquam Harbor Light, perhaps the village's most historic edifice. The lighthouse has been in the same spot since 1801, having undergone significant repairs in 1850.

The movie Good Son starring Macaulay Culkin was filmed here.

Marilyn Monroe is said to have secretly vacationed here, renting a cottage on Lobster Cove at which she was visited by John F. Kennedy, who was introduced to the area by his Harvard University roommate Benjamin A Smith II.

Historic sites
 Annisquam Bridge
 Norwood-Hyatt House

References

1631 establishments in Massachusetts
Gloucester, Massachusetts
Neighborhoods in Massachusetts
Populated places established in 1631
Populated places in Essex County, Massachusetts